The 2006 FIA Formula One World Championship was the 60th season of Formula One motor racing. It featured the 57th Formula One World Championship which began on 12 March and ended on 22 October after eighteen races. The Drivers' Championship was won by Fernando Alonso of Renault for the second year in a row, with Alonso becoming the youngest ever double world champion at the time. Then-retiring seven-time world champion Michael Schumacher of Scuderia Ferrari finished runner-up, 13 points behind. The Constructors' Championship was won by Renault, which defeated Ferrari by five points.

The season was highlighted by the rivalry between Alonso and Schumacher, who each won seven races. Renault and Ferrari drivers dominated the field, victorious in all but one race: the Hungarian Grand Prix was won by Honda's Jenson Button, and the four second-place finishes not achieved by Renault or Ferrari were accomplished by McLaren. For the first time since the  season, no British constructor won any race and only factory teams won all the races during this year (as in 1956). This season marked the beginning of the usage of 2.4L V8 engines in Formula One from the 3.0L V10 engines that were used in the previous seasons, which continued till the end of the  season. 2006 was also the first season since  and  respectively that various engine displacements and configurations were featured only for Scuderia Toro Rosso that had Cosworth TJ2005-2 3.0-litre V10 powerplant.

The season saw several changes occurring in the drivers' market starting already in December 2005 as Alonso sealed a move to McLaren for 2007. Among other notable departures included Juan Pablo Montoya, who left McLaren mid-season to pursue a career in NASCAR.

As of 2022, this is the last Constructors' Championship for Renault, and the last Drivers' Championship for a Spanish Formula One driver. It is also the last season for Michelin as a tyre supplier, the last season to have two tyre suppliers, and also the last season overall to have more than one tyre supplier,  as the French tyre company withdrew from Formula One at the end of the season.

Teams and drivers
The following teams and drivers competed in the 2006 FIA Formula One World Championship.

Free practice drivers
Seven constructors entered free practice only drivers over the course of the season.

Team changes
 Three prominent names in the sport disappeared for this season, with Minardi, BAR and Jordan changing names under new ownership, while Sauber changed ownership, and one new team, Super Aguri, entered at the last moment. Minardi were taken over by Red Bull, becoming Toro Rosso, which is Italian for Red Bull. The Sauber name remained, although largely as a sentiment, as BMW had purchased 80% of the team, with Peter Sauber keeping only a 20% share. A year after Alex Shnaider had purchased the team and following a disappointing final season under the Jordan name, Jordan was renamed to MF1 Racing after Shnaider's Midland Group company. Late in the season, the team was bought by Spyker. Honda, who already owned a 45% stake in the BAR team, completed their takeover of the team and changed its name to Honda Racing F1 Team at the start of the season. Super Aguri F1 also entered their first season after having problems entering. They received backing from Honda including technology and engines, due to them running Honda factory driver Takuma Sato.
 Williams introduced numerous changes for 2006, particularly changing to Cosworth V8 engines after they and BMW split. Williams and Toyota changed tyre suppliers to Bridgestone, due to Michelin's desire to supply fewer teams in the championship. Despite this, Toro Rosso, who under the Minardi name ran Bridgestone tyres, switched to Michelin in line with parent team RBR.

Driver changes
 Ferrari replaced Michael Schumacher's longtime teammate Rubens Barrichello with fellow Brazilian Felipe Massa, who moved from Sauber. Massa had previously tested with Ferrari in 2003. Massa was replaced at the newly renamed BMW Sauber team by Nick Heidfeld, who had driven for BMW's previous partners Williams for much of 2005. Poland's Robert Kubica took up the third driver's role at BMW Sauber.
 Barrichello moved to Honda, where he replaced the outgoing Takuma Sato. The Honda-backed Super Aguri team started the season with Sato and Yuji Ide, an all-Japanese driver line up. Franck Montagny moved from his Renault testing role to become Super Aguri's third driver. His position at Renault was taken by the GP2 runner-up Heikki Kovalainen.
 Williams promoted test driver Nico Rosberg, who had won the inaugural GP2 drivers' title, to their second seat alongside Mark Webber. Alexander Wurz, one of McLaren's test drivers from 2005, joined Williams as a third driver, alongside India's Narain Karthikeyan, who had raced for Jordan the previous season. Gary Paffett was promoted to a permanent testing role at McLaren alongside Pedro de la Rosa.
 Karthikeyan's seat at Jordan, now renamed as MF1, was taken by the 2005 Minardi driver Christijan Albers. MF1 decided to employ a rotation system for their third driver position. Minardi's other driver, Robert Doornbos, took up a test driving role at Red Bull. Vitantonio Liuzzi, who had shared Red Bull's second seat with Christian Klien in 2005, moved to Red Bull's newly acquired sister team Toro Rosso—previously Minardi—where he partnered his fellow Red Bull-backed driver Scott Speed. The Swiss driver Neel Jani became Toro Rosso's third driver.

Mid-season changes
 After the San Marino Grand Prix Super Aguri's Yuji Ide had his superlicence revoked by the FIA and could no longer race in Formula One. He was replaced by the team's reserve driver Franck Montagny for the next race. Super Aguri hired Sakon Yamamoto, one of Jordan's test drivers from 2005, to be their third driver from the British Grand Prix onwards, in place of the promoted Montagny. Yamamoto and Montagny switched places from the German Grand Prix onwards.
 After the United States Grand Prix, Juan Pablo Montoya announced he was moving to NASCAR for the 2007 season and leaving McLaren. The next day, McLaren announced that Montoya would be replaced in their driver line up by test driver Pedro de la Rosa, ending Montoya's five and a half-year F1 career since 2001.
 Robert Kubica was promoted to a race seat by BMW Sauber at the Hungarian Grand Prix, replacing 1997 World Champion Jacques Villeneuve, possibly due to Villeneuve's injuries after a heavy crash in the German Grand Prix. On the day after the Hungarian GP (7 August 2006), BMW Sauber announced that Villeneuve had left the team with immediate effect, with Kubica replacing him permanently for the remainder of the season. German Formula 3 driver Sebastian Vettel became BMW Sauber's third driver from the Turkish Grand Prix onwards, replacing the promoted Kubica.
 On 11 September 2006, Red Bull Racing announced that the team's third/test driver, Robert Doornbos would replace the sacked-Christian Klien for the final three races of the season as a result of Klien's string of poor results. For the races in China and Japan, Michael Ammermüller replaced Doornbos as third driver.
 Spyker MF1 announced a duo of new third drivers for two of the final races of the year. GP2 Series drivers Alexandre Prémat and Ernesto Viso took part in practice in China and Brazil respectively; Adrian Sutil, who had previously tested in Germany and France, again tested for the team in Japan.
 During the test at the Silverstone Circuit in September, GP2 Series drivers Lewis Hamilton, Nelson Piquet Jr., and Adrián Vallés performed test duties for McLaren, Renault and MF1, respectively. Super Aguri's former race driver Franck Montagny also tested for Toyota.

Season calendar
The Australian Grand Prix was held later than usual, to avoid a clash with the 2006 Commonwealth Games. For the first time, Bahrain hosted the first Grand Prix. Brazil hosted the last race, while Japan and China swapped their original dates.

In 2006, the FIA announced the Belgian Grand Prix would not be part of the 2006 Formula One season, since the local authorities had started major repair work in Spa-Francorchamps. The Belgian Grand Prix returned in 2007, when Kimi Räikkönen took pole position and his 3rd Belgian Grand Prix win in a row.

Regulation changes

Technical regulations 
 In an attempt to curb the increasing engine power levels of recent years, the maximum engine displacement was reduced from 3.0 to 2.4 litres and the number of cylinders from 10 to 8. At similar engine speeds, the change was expected to cut peak power by around 200 bhp, which would equate to around three to five seconds on lap times at most circuits. (Scuderia Toro Rosso continued to use 3.0-litre 10-cylinder engines with both rev and air-intake limiters to avoid the costs of re-engineering their cars in a short period). Initial testing indicated the new engines were six seconds slower than their V10 counterparts, but early in the season, it became obvious that despite the decrease in power, lap times were not far from 2005 figures; on some circuits, the fastest laps set this year were actually faster than the ones recorded last year, with the V10 engines.
 Some engine suppliers indicated early that their smaller V8s can rev higher than the 19,000 rpms normal for 2005-spec V10s. Northampton-based engine builder Cosworth had an enviable record of success with V8 engines. It made further history by becoming the first manufacturer to have broken the 20,000 rpm limit on track in December 2005.
 Tyre changes returned to Formula One in 2006. Each driver is limited to 14 sets of tyres per race weekend. This consists of seven sets of dry-weather tyres, four sets of wet-weather tyres and three sets of extreme-weather tyres. The thinking behind this is that the reduced engine size will offset any performance gain. The number of constructors who were supplied tyres by Michelin was down from seven to six while Bridgestone increased from three to five. Michelin announced they would withdraw from the championship after the 2006 season.

Sporting regulations 
 A new qualifying system consisting of three sessions of varying length was introduced. A 15-minute session was held first, in which the six slowest cars from that session were eliminated and thus set in grid positions 17–22. After a five-minute break, another 15-minute session was held with the remaining cars, and again the six slowest cars were eliminated and set in positions 11–16. These twelve eliminated drivers were placed in parc fermé, but allowed to modify fuel loads as they see fit.
 During a further five-minute break, the remaining 10 cars declared their fuel loads to the FIA. A final 20 minute session then decided the top 10 grid positions. Teams were allowed to run their fuel load low by making as many laps as possible, and thus improve their times as the weight falls. This was considered an improvement for TV audiences because teams needed to run as many laps as possible to lower their fuel loads. Following this session, the top ten cars were placed in parc ferme and required to refill their fuel load to the level of that at the beginning of the final 20 minutes. Starting with the 2006 French Grand Prix, qualifying for final session was cut short to just 15 minutes, making all of the sessions the same length, and the ability for drivers to complete a flying lap after the chequered flag drop now applied in the first two sessions as well.
 A loophole was detected by the FIA, in that teams could declare a large fuel load but on the out lap "leak", or use a large quantity of fuel to lighten a car and permit a faster lap. The FIA decided to only count laps that are within 110% of the driver's fastest time, and allow teams to top up with the amount of fuel used for those laps.
 Only one free practice session was held on Saturdays, for one hour, and it ended no less than two hours before qualifying begins, usually between 11.00 and 12.00, replacing the old system of two 45-minute sessions. Friday remained unchanged, with two one-hour sessions, starting three hours apart.
 The tuned mass damper system was used by several teams, notably Renault, during the latter part of 2005 and the 2006 seasons. The devices were located in the nosecone, and were particularly effective in corners and over kerbs to keep the tyres in closer contact to the track surface than they would otherwise be. After the French Grand Prix, the FIA announced that the system would be outlawed. This had a particularly significant effect on Renault, as the team had effectively built their cars around the devices, and had introduced them as long ago as the 2005 Brazilian Grand Prix. At the German Grand Prix the Renault team submitted one of their cars for scrutineering by the race stewards, who ruled that the devices were acceptable. The FIA launched an appeal against this decision, and on 23 August 2006 the FIA International Court of Appeal issued a statement upholding this appeal and rejecting the stewards' decision. The Court of Appeal stated that the system infringed part of the bodywork section (Article 3.15) of the Formula One Technical Regulations, which stated that any specific part of the car influencing its aerodynamic performance had to: comply with the rules relating to bodywork, be rigidly secured to the entirely sprung part of the car (rigidly secured means not having any degree of freedom), and remain immobile in relation to the sprung part of the car. The central argument was whether the mass dampers function as aerodynamic devices or as a part of the suspension system. The FIA reasoned that because the devices did not "remain immobile in relation to the sprung part of the car", they were illegal. But the FIA failed to explain how the damper, which was entirely enclosed with the car can be counted as bodywork when article 1.4 of the regulations defined bodywork as:
All entirely sprung parts of the car in contact with the external air stream, except cameras and the parts definitely associated with the mechanical functioning of the engine, transmission and running gear. Airboxes, radiators and engine exhausts are considered to be part of the bodywork. 
Following the ruling by the Court of Appeal, the system was officially banned before the 2006 Turkish Grand Prix. In a later interview, Renault's Flavio Briatore named McLaren as the team who complained to the FIA.

Background
The calendar was initially announced as the same as for 2005, with the Belgian Grand Prix scheduled for 17 September. However, on 8 February, the FIA announced that the Belgian National Sporting Authority (RACB) were withdrawing Spa-Francorchamps from the 2006 Formula One calendar due to a lack of time to complete improvements to the track. The race has traditionally received strong support from drivers and FIA President Max Mosley and the Grand Prix was back on the Grand Prix calendar for the  season.

2006 was the last season with two tyre manufacturers: The two manufacturers at the time were Japanese manufacturer Bridgestone and French company Michelin. In December 2005, the FIA announced that from the 2008 season, there would be only one tyre supplier. Five days later, Michelin announced it would quit Formula One at the end of the 2006 season as it did not want to be in Formula One as the sole tyre supplier.

At the end of 2005, three well-known teams were bought out: Minardi, Sauber and Jordan. The former were bought by Red Bull to be run as a junior team to house their growing list of young talent looking for an F1 drive. Despite campaigns by Minardi fans the team were renamed Scuderia Toro Rosso (Toro Rosso), Italian for Team Red Bull. The Sauber team was purchased by BMW. BMW opted to keep the Sauber name in F1 renaming the team BMW Sauber. Jordan, who had been bought by the Midland Group in 2004, changed their name to MF1 Racing after a transition year in 2005.

2006 also saw the introduction of a new Japanese team, Super Aguri F1, founded by former F1 driver Aguri Suzuki, who entered at the last moment. Super Aguri notified the FIA on 1 November 2005 (ahead of the governing body's 15 November deadline) of their intention to enter, but the FIA's initial entry list stated they had not approved Aguri's entry. However, the team received the consent of the ten existing teams to compete and paid the US$48 million bond required as a deposit. The team was confirmed by the FIA on 26 January 2006.

Between the 2005 and 2006 season the ownership of Formula One changed significantly. Until November 2005 the Formula One group was owned by an Ecclestone family trust and Speed Investments (a grouping of Bayerische Landesbank, JP Morgan Chase and Lehman Brothers). On 25 November, CVC Capital Partners announced it was to purchase both the Ecclestone shares (25% of SLEC) and Bayerische Landesbank's 48% share, held through Speed Investments. By 30 March, CVC had acquired all remaining shares and later that month the European Commission announced approval of this deal, conditional upon CVC relinquishing control of Dorna Sports, promoter of MotoGP. On 28 March CVC announced the completion of the Formula One transaction. Ecclestone reinvested proceeds of his stake into the new Formula One parent company Alpha Prema.

Another Ecclestone victory involved the Grand Prix Manufacturers' Association's proposal for an alternative world championship. On 27 March, the five car manufacturers involved lodged applications for the  season, reducing the likelihood of a breakaway series. On 14 May, Grand Prix Manufacturers' Association (GPMA) members confirmed they had signed a Memorandum of Understanding, a move toward signing a new Concorde Agreement. Five days later, Bernie Ecclestone and CVC Capital Partners signed a Memorandum of Understanding with the GPMA which should see the five "rebels" continue racing in Formula One at least until the 2012 season.

Season report

Pre-season
The pre-season test was originally scheduled to be held at the Circuit de Catalunya in Barcelona, Spain from 24–26 February, but following the rescheduling of the Australian Grand Prix to avoid a clash with the 2006 Commonwealth Games in Melbourne, it was instead held at the Bahrain International Circuit in Sakhir from 3–5 March, just before the first race of the season at the same venue.

Report 

After a disastrous  season and slow start to the 2006 season Michael Schumacher won consecutive races at Imola and the Nürburgring. During the final lap of his qualifying session for the Monaco Grand Prix, Schumacher came to a stop at the La Rascasse hairpin, resulting in yellow flags, meaning that other drivers could not go at maximum speed. After the session there were immediate complaints from the other teams claiming that this was a deliberate move by Schumacher to ensure he started in pole position – Alonso's flying lap that was affected by the yellow flags had been likely to beat Schumacher's fastest time – at the end of the second sector, Alonso was more than two-tenths of a second ahead of Schumacher's time, and his final time was just 0.064 seconds slower than Schumacher. Although Schumacher insisted that he had simply locked up his brakes at the corner, a stewards' inquiry stated, "We are left with no alternative but to conclude that the driver deliberately stopped his car on the circuit." The penalty was that Schumacher's qualifying times were all deleted, demoting him to 22nd position on the grid. He opted to start from the pitlane, and finished fifth, after an incident in the race that required the safety car to be deployed. The Safety Car failed to aid Schumacher however, but in fact hampered him; because he was the last car to be lapped by leader Alonso, and under 2006 FIA rules; he was not allowed to un-lap himself under Safety Car conditions. This meant he was almost a full lap down on third placed Coulthard, and fourth placed Barrichello on the resumption of the race. But by the end, he was threatening to pass them for position; finishing less than two seconds off a podium spot.

At the British Grand Prix, Alonso became the first Spanish driver and the youngest driver (24 years and 317 days) to win a race from pole and get fastest lap, leading every lap of the race except one. Schumacher won the United States Grand Prix, his fourth consecutive victory at Indianapolis and fifth career victory there, and the French Grand Prix.

The FIA decided that the 'Mass Damper' system used by Renault up to this point of the season did not meet the technical regulations, and it was banned – a polemical decision, since the FIA itself was consulted about the system during its development, and authorised its use. The effect of the ban was clear at the next race where the Renaults struggled to even get points. Schumacher also won the German Grand Prix at Hockenheim, with Alonso finishing 5th.

Jenson Button achieved his first Formula One career victory in the Hungarian Grand Prix. Alonso had a mechanical failure whilst leading in the latter stages of the race whilst Michael Schumacher retired after a collision with Nick Heidfeld. However Schumacher was promoted to eighth place in the standings (having been classified ninth following a retirement three laps from the end) because Robert Kubica's debut ended in disqualification. The Polish driver had finished seventh in the BMW.

Felipe Massa won the next Grand Prix in Turkey, so for the second race in a row, Formula One had a maiden victor. Fernando Alonso extended his lead over Michael Schumacher by two points after he managed to finish a tenth of a second ahead of the German in second place.

At the Italian Grand Prix, Alonso was given a penalty for 'holding up' Massa during the final qualification session. Many in the Formula One 'paddock' were reported to disagree with the penalty and Max Mosley has since said that he would not have issued the same penalty as the race stewards. Schumacher reduced Alonso's lead to only two points after winning the race while Alonso suffered an engine failure in the late stages of the race. Despite a fourth-place finish for Alonso's teammate, Giancarlo Fisichella, and a flat-spotted tyre causing Felipe Massa to score no points, the race also saw Ferrari pull ahead of Renault for the first time in 2006. Polish driver Robert Kubica took his BMW Sauber to his first podium finish, in only his third race, but the race results were largely overshadowed by Schumacher announcing, during the post-race press conference, that he would retire at the end of the season. Afterwards he did say that he would hold a position in the Ferrari F1 team for 2007, though he did not disclose what.

Three weeks later, with his victory at Shanghai right ahead of Alonso, Schumacher drew level on points with him at the head of the championship. Schumacher led the World Championship for the first time in 2006 after the race, as he had won seven races compared to Alonso's six. Massa did not finish the race, and Renault gained again the lead in the Constructors' Championship thanks to Fisichella's third place. As Shanghai would prove to be the German's last victory of the season as well as the 91st and last victory of his career before retiring at the end of the season.

A week later at the Japanese Grand Prix, Felipe Massa took pole ahead of Michael Schumacher in second and Fernando Alonso in fifth. Schumacher quickly took the lead and set about gaining a five-second lead, which continued until after the second round of pit stops. However, Schumacher's engine failed with 17 laps to go, forcing him to retire and handing Alonso the win ahead of Massa.

At the final round, the Brazilian Grand Prix, Massa again took pole. Drama in qualifying saw Michael Schumacher have a mysterious failure, meaning that he started down in tenth, while Alonso began in fifth. In the race, Schumacher had yet more bad luck, suffering a puncture just a few laps in. He recovered to finish fourth, while teammate Massa became the first Brazilian to win his home Grand Prix since Ayrton Senna in 1993. Alonso finished second to secure his second successive championship, adding the record of the youngest man to secure back-to-back titles to his ever-increasing list of records. Fisichella finished sixth for Renault, meaning that the French outfit secured their second successive Constructors' title. McLaren failed to secure a single win in the season for the first time since  and it was the first season since  that a British constructor failed to win a race.

Results and standings

Grands Prix

Scoring system

Points were awarded to the top eight classified finishers using the following structure:

In the event of a tie, a count-back system was used as a tie-breaker, with a driver's best result used to decide the standings.

World Drivers' Championship standings

Notes:
 – Drivers did not finish the Grand Prix, but were classified as they completed more than 90% of the race distance.

World Constructors' Championship standings

Notes:
 – Drivers did not finish the Grand Prix, but were classified as they completed more than 90% of the race distance.
Official FIA results listed the constructors as Mild Seven Renault F1 Team, Scuderia Ferrari Marlboro, Team McLaren Mercedes, etc.

Notes

References

External links 

 formula1.com – 2006 official driver standings
 formula1.com – 2006 official team standings
 2006 season at FIA.com
 2006 season at ManipeF1.com
 2006 season at GrandPrix.com
 2006 season at Chicanef1.com

Formula One seasons
 
Formula 1